Iberg Castle may refer to:

 Iberg Castle, Aargau, Switzerland
 Iberg Castle, St. Gallen, Switzerland